Jamboree 2011 may refer to:

Scout jamborees
22nd World Organization of the Scout Movement World Scout Jamboree, Rinkaby, Sweden,
3rd World Federation of Independent Scouts World Jamboree, Puebla de Zaragoza, Mexico

Other
Jamboree in the Hills